Monte Marmagna is a mountain of the Apennine Mountains. It is located in Italy on the border between Tuscany and Emilia-Romagna.

Geography 
The mountain has an elevation of 1,852 m and is one of the highest points in the Emilia-Romagna region of Italy.

References

External links 

Monte Marmagna on SummitPost

Mountains of Emilia-Romagna
Mountains of Tuscany
Mountains of the Apennines
Archaeological sites in Italy
Province of Massa-Carrara
Neolithic
Biosphere reserves of Italy